R. floribunda may refer to:

 Rhodanthe floribunda, a plant endemic to Australia
 Rudolfiella floribunda, an orchid native to western South America